Alejo Alvarez (c. 1890s – c. 1940s) was a Filipino track and field athlete who competed in the shot put and discus throw events.

Alongside Regino Ylanan, he was the most successful throws athlete at the Far Eastern Championship Games. Alvarez competed in two editions of the competition.

He returned at the following edition in Manila in 1919 and completed a throws double for the host nation. This made him one of Asia's foremost throws athletes at the start of the 20th century. He was one of only a dozen track athletes to win three or more individual titles during the history of the Far Eastern Championship Games, which was the first major multi-sport event in Asia and a forerunner to the Asian Games.

He was killed in the Philippines during World War II, defending against the Japanese invasion.

References

Year of birth missing
Year of death missing
Filipino male discus throwers
Filipino male shot putters
Filipino military personnel of World War II